This is a list of all United States Supreme Court cases from volume 487 of the United States Reports:

External links

1988 in United States case law